They Were Not Divided is a 1950 British war film, which depicted the Guards Armoured Division in Second World War Europe. It was written and directed by Terence Young, a former Guards officer who served in the campaigns depicted in the film.

The cast consists of little known professional actors, and real soldiers with speaking parts. The male leads are Edward Underdown and Ralph Clanton with Michael Trubshawe. Two supporting actors who became famous later on are Christopher Lee as a tank commander and Desmond Llewelyn as a tank gunner. Anthony Dawson later made appearances in a large number of Terence Young's films.

Sections of the action are interspersed with documentary footage from the war creating the "scene-setting".

Plot
During the middle years of the war, three men are called up to serve in the British Army. The Englishman Philip Hamilton (Underdown), the American David Morgan (Clanton) and the Irishman Smoke O'Connor (Michael Brennan) are conscripted into the Guards Division and report to their barracks at Caterham, Surrey. After going through strict training (including real Coldstream Guards Regimental Sergeant Major Brittain) they find themselves receiving emergency promotions. Philip and David are promoted to 2nd lieutenant and Smoke to corporal and are attached to a tank company of the Welsh Guards, where Philip and David command their own tank and Smoke is part of David's crew. Months of 'real' training follow, where they learn about tank warfare and also their comrades.

The film follows the three main characters as the Guards Armoured Division lands at Normandy weeks after D-Day, and on into action as part of the break-out. Following the crew of a Sherman tank, they cope with different aspects of fighting a war on another continent, such as being separated from family and loved ones and coping with the loss of comrades. Operation Market Garden and the Battle of the Bulge are depicted, but with the Welsh Guards as the pivotal British Army unit. During Market Garden, the Welsh Guards are shown linking up with American paratroopers at the Grave bridge before moving on to Nijmegen and the failure of the operation. The film ends with the Ardennes Offensive and the Guards' unknown operations around the east side of the River Meuse, and only Smoke left alive of the three friends.

Cast
 Edward Underdown as Philip Hamilton 
 Ralph Clanton as David Morgan
 Helen Cherry as Wilhelmina
 Stella Andrew as Jane
 Michael Brennan as Smoke O’Connor
 Michael Trubshawe as Major Bushey Noble
 Rupert Gerard as Earl of Bentham
 John Wynn as ’45 Jones
 Desmond Llewelyn as ’77 Jones
 Anthony Dawson as Michael
 Estelle Brody as War Correspondent
 Rufus Cruikshank as Sergeant Dean
 R.S.M. Brittain as Regimental Sergeant Major
 Christopher Lee as Chris Lewis
Charles Stuart Payton (Welsh Guards) as Corporal Instructor at the guards depot Caterham.

Featured vehicles 
A large number of actual Second World War armoured vehicles are featured or make brief appearances, including scenes featuring a German Tiger tank (namely Tiger 131) and a disabled Panther.

Reception
Trade papers called the film a "notable box office attraction" in British cinemas in 1950. According to one account it was one of the most popular British films of the year along with The Happiest Days of our Lives, Morning Departure, Odette and The Wooden Horse. According to Kinematograph Weekly the 'biggest winners' at the box office in 1950 Britain were The Blue Lamp, The Happiest Days of Your Life, Annie Get Your Gun, The Wooden Horse, Treasure Island and Odette, with "runners up" being Stage Fright, White Heat, They Were Not Divided, Trio, Morning Departure, Destination Moon, Sands of Iwo Jima, Little Women, The Forsythe Saga, Father of the Bride, Neptune's Daughter, The Dancing Years, The Red Light, Rogues of Sherwood Forest, Fancy Pants, Copper Canyon, State Secret, The Cure for Love, My Foolish Heart, Stromboli, Cheaper by the Dozen, Pinky, Three Came Home, Broken Arrow and Black Rose.

References

External links
 

1950 films
British war films
Films about armoured warfare
Films directed by Terence Young
British World War II films
Western Front of World War II films
Films set in Normandy
Films set in Surrey
Films shot in Germany
Guards Division (United Kingdom)
1950 war films
British black-and-white films
Films about the British Army
1950s English-language films
1950s British films